Mukah (muːkəh), historically known as Muka is a coastal town which serves as the capital and the administrative center of the Mukah Division since 1 March 2002.

It is located on the Borneo island, by the South China Sea, about 3 hours by road from the city of Sibu. Mukah is also accessible by air by MASwings from Kuching and Miri. The duration of both flights is about one hour. The speed boat trip takes approximately 2 hours.

Etymology

There are several versions of the origin of the name "Mukah". The word "Mukah" is similar to the Malay word "muka" which means face. It was said that the town was name after the face of a mysterious beautiful woman who helped three shipwreck merchants from Brunei.

Another version was that a beautiful face appeared on the surface on the sea to fishermen. However, these does not explain on why the town adopted a Malay name instead of a Melanau name as the majority of the population here are the Melanau people. The Melanau word for face is "jawai".

Mukah town has statues of Ikan Merah (Red Snapper) and Udang (Prawn) that reflect the importance of the fishery industry to the town.

History 
The Melanau people is the earliest indigenous group living in Mukah. The earliest documentation of Mukah can be found in the annals of the Majapahit empire where a place known as "Melano" was paying tribute to the empire. The place was then became part of the Bruneian Empire in the 13th century. Mukah was later sold to the Raj of Sarawak in 1860.

In November 1862, the Rajah Muda rescued several civilians from the Moro Pirates after a pitched naval battle off the coast of Mukah. During the fighting, Brooke's steamer named Rainbow sank four prahus and damaged one other with cannon fire. Over 100 pirates were killed or wounded in the engagement while Brooke, the bishop Francis McDougall and their Sarawakian followers, were mostly unscathed.

Government
Mukah and Dalat District Office is the governing body of the Mukah and Dalat districts, including the towns. The district office was established in 1947 as Native Local Authority (NLA). The district office then expands it power to Dalat, Oya, Balingian in 1981.

Geography
Mukah town is located at the mouth of the Mukah River. Mukah is located on peat land that is still covered by peat swamp forests.

Climate
Mukah has a tropical rainforest climate (Af) with heavy to very heavy rainfall year-round.

Demographics 
In 2017, Mukah District had a projected population of 49,900.

Economy
Sago processing and fishing are the two main economic activities in Mukah.

Since 2008, Mukah is the economic centre of Sarawak Corridor of Renewable Energy (SCORE). Press Metal Sdn Bhd built its first aluminium smelting plant in Mukah in 2009.

Transport

Air
In term of air connectivity, Mukah was served by Mukah Airport (STOLport)  since 1960s. Mukah Old STOLport  airport was only able to accommodate an 18-seater Twin-Otter aircraft. The airport used to operate routes to Kuching and Miri. An effort has been made to upgrade the Mukah airport.

On 17 June 2021, the new Mukah Airport was opened and began to its operation to replace the previous Mukah short-release and landing (STOLport) functions. The new airport can handle up to 264,000 passengers per year, as well as the new runway could indeed support turbine planes and helicopters.

Road
Mukah is linked to Selangau through the Mukah-Selangau road and to Bintulu through Mukah-Kuala Tatau road.

Buses

Bus express to Dalat, Sibu and Bintulu are available.

Local Bus or Bus Express remain unclear

Other facilities

Education
Mukah Polytechnic (PMU) is the 20th and the third polytechnic in Borneo after Politeknik Kuching and Politeknik Kota Kinabalu, Sabah. The PMU campus is built on a 100-acre site and is equipped with modern infrastructure and state of the art educational facilities.

PMU's first operation began at Sibu Technical Secondary School in 2004. The first intake of students was in the July 2005 session with pilot courses such as Certificate in Information Technology, Certificate in Civil Engineering and Certificate in Business Studies. Course offerings increased a year later where Diploma level courses were also offered by all five major academic departments.

Maktab Rendah Sains MARA Mukah (MRSM) was opened in 2010. It is a boarding school that provides good quality education for selected secondary school students. SMK St. Patrick, the oldest secondary school in Mukah town and division was established in 1905. SMK Three Rivers was established in 1961 to serve the education needs of the people living in the Mukah, Oya, and Balingian river basins. SMK Mukah was opened in 1999.
UiTM Sarawak Mukah campus was opened on 16 November 2015 in order to train enough manpower for Sarawak Corridor of Renewable Energy (SCORE). Among the courses offered are Pre Diploma (Commerce and Science), Diploma in Business Studies, Diploma in Banking Studies, Diploma in Herbal Production, Diploma in Aquaculture and Diploma in Plantation Management.

Centre of Technical Excellence (CENTEXS) Mukah was opened in 2020 and began to operate in 2021. The completion of the campus itself making it the fifth CENTEXS campus to be built outside of Kuching after Lundu, Dalat, Lawas and Betong.

Future Developments 
The proposed development project for Kolej Laila Taib (KLT) here commenced since 2017 and once completed, will add another institution of higher learning in Mukah.

The site for the proposed Universiti Malaysia Sarawak’s (Unimas) Excellent Research Centre project is also located within the same area at the same spur road, about 300m from PMU and KLT project.

Meanwhile, the proposed Giat Mara project nearby the CENTEXS project is scheduled to complete by November 2021. Once completed, these projects are expected to propel this district to emerge as an education hub in the near future.

Declaration of Mukah Division 

State Executive Council, the demarcation of the Sibu Division and Sarikei Division Administrative areas to form the Mukah Division was effective on 1 March 2002. Regarding to this, the Mukah Division was declared as the Tenth (10) Division on 1 March 2002 by the Most Honorable Pehin Sri Haji Abdul Taib Mahmud, Chief Minister of Sarawak. The recognition of Mukah as a Division has opened a new chapter in the administrative machinery of the state of Sarawak when it covers the entire coastal area in the central part of Sarawak. Thus, the declaration makes Mukah District as the administrative center and the capital of the division.

Culture and leisure
Lamin Dana cultural Lounge is located at Kampung Tellian. It is a place where the residents of the village showcase their traditional arts, crafts, and authentic Melanau food. A Melanau delicacy named Umai is one of the popular dishes in the town. It is a raw fish salad served with sago pellets. Sago is the staple food for the Melanau people. They usually takes sago together with fish, Sambal, and Ulam.

Mukah Kaul festival is held annually at the third week of April. It was a traditional ritual by the Melanau people for thanksgiving and continuation of good fortune by appeasing the spirits of the sea, land, forests, and farms.

References

External links
 Laman Web Rasmi Majlis Daerah Dalat & Mukah
 Laman Web Rasmi Pejabat Daerah Mukah
 Laman Web Rasmi Pejabat Residen Mukah
UiTM Sarawak Kampus Mukah
 Mukah Polytechnic Website
 Mukah Kaul Festival on Virtual Malaysia Website
 Kaul Festival on STB website
 Mukah Pictures
 Kaipulehone has written materials (RB1-002, RB2-003) on Mukah, as well as audio recordings

Mukah District
Towns in Sarawak
Fishing areas of the South China Sea